is a Japanese handball player who has been captain of the Japan women's national handball team. She is currently playing for the Japanese club of Osaka Lovvits. She was listed among the top ten goalscorers at the 2009 World Women's Handball Championship in China.

References

Living people
1985 births
Japanese female handball players
Asian Games medalists in handball
Handball players at the 2010 Asian Games
Asian Games silver medalists for Japan
Medalists at the 2010 Asian Games
Handball players at the 2020 Summer Olympics
21st-century Japanese women
20th-century Japanese women